TÜV Nord Group is a technical service provider with worldwide activities. Founded in 1869 and headquartered in Hanover, Germany, the Group employs more than 10,000 people in more than 70 countries of Europe, Asia, America and Africa. The Group is divided into the following operative brands and business units:

 TÜV Nord: Industrial Services, Mobility, Training, IT 
 DMT: Engineering and Natural Resources
 Alter Technology and HTV Group: Aerospace , Semiconductor and Electronics 

TÜVs (German abbreviation: Technischer Überwachungsverein, English: Technical Inspection Association) are German organizations that work to validate the safety of products and services of all kinds to protect humans, material assets and the environment against hazards.

History 
The story of TÜV Nord Group has its roots in the traditional boiler inspection associations founded by the industry, which in 1869 voluntarily undertook to begin monitoring and ensuring the operational safety of boilers. Gradually, the government gave the DÜV, later known as the TÜV (Technical Inspection Association) additional safety-related tasks, such as the regular inspection of automobiles, still a watchword for road safety in Germany today.

Recently acquired companies 
 2007: DMT GmbH & Co. KG (Germany), Verebus Engineering BV (Netherlands)
 2010: RAG Bildung GmbH
 2011: Alter Technology Group (Spain)
 2023: HTV and HTV Conservation (Germany)

External links 
 TÜV Nord Group website
 FAHSS TÜV Nord Saudi Arabia website

References 

Environmental certification marks
Companies based in Hanover
Companies established in 1869
Multinational companies headquartered in Germany
Product certification
Standards organisations in Germany
1869 establishments in Prussia